In mathematics, in the field of homological algebra, given an abelian category 
 having enough injectives and an additive (covariant) functor 

,

 for all ,

where  are the right derived functors of 
.

References
 

Homological algebra